Katharine Luomala (September 10, 1907 – February 27, 1992) was an American anthropologist known for her studies of comparative mythology in Oceania.

Born in Cloquet, Minnesota and educated at the University of California, Berkeley, Luomala began her anthropological studies there by working with the Navajo people in the 1930s, chronicling their changing lives. She earned her AB in 1931, MA in 1933, and PhD in 1936. In 1941 she became an honorary associate at the Bishop Museum in Hawaii, which position she maintained for the rest of her working life. In 1946 she became a professor of anthropology at the University of Hawaii, where she studied Hawaiian mythology and, from 1950, the ethnobotany of the Gilbert Islands, remaining there until her retirement in 1973. Luomala was a fellow of the American Anthropological Association and a member of the Anthropological Society of Hawaii, the Polynesian Society, Phi Beta Kappa, and Sigma Xi.

References 

1907 births
1992 deaths
20th-century American academics
20th-century American women scientists
20th-century American anthropologists
American women academics
American women anthropologists
People from Cloquet, Minnesota
University of California, Berkeley alumni
University of Hawaiʻi faculty